"Les Démons de minuit" is the debut single of the French band Images. Released in June 1986, it was the first single from their first album Album d'Images. Very popular, the song was a huge hit in France. It was the summer hit of 1986, peaking at number one for 13 weeks.

Background and writing

"Les Démons de minuit" was also released as an English version (by the same group), titled "Love Emotion".

It was very difficult for the group to find a record company agreeing to sign a contract with them, because at the beginning nobody believed in the potential of the song.

Christophe Desprès, who took part in the composition of the song, was also a member of the group Pacifique, which released two hits in the late 1980s.

At the time, the music video apparently was regarded scandalous in France as it featured a little particular priest, tortured by the temptation among seductive women.

Chart performances

In France, the single debuted at #30 on SNEP Chart on 21 June 1986. It reached very quickly the top 10 (two weeks after), and climbed to #1 on July 19. There it stayed for 13 weeks. After that, the single fell almost every week but managed to stay in the charts until its 30th week.

For about seven years, "Les Démons de minuit" remained the song with "most weeks at number one" on French SNEP Singles Chart (this record was also performed in 1987 by Licence IV's "Viens boire un p'tit coup à la maison", and was beaten in 1993 by Jordy's "Dur dur d'être bébé!", which stayed at #1 for 15 weeks).

It was one of the most successful singles of the 1980s in France.

Cover versions
"Les Démons de minuit" was re-recorded by the group Images in 1996 in a remixed version and features in this new version on their cover album Jusqu'au bout de la nuit, which was #1 on French Albums Chart for four weeks in France and #6 in Belgium (Wallonia).

In 1999, the song was included in a successful medley entitled "Jusqu'au bout de la nuit", performed with Émile, the singer of French band Gold (#12 in France, #24 in Wallonia).

The song was covered by DV8 feat. R. Fame in 2002. It was also covered by Soma Riba and DJ Fou in 2005, and this version achieved a minor success, failing the Top 50 (#54 in France).

The playback of the song was used for a rap version in English-language under the title "Devil's Rap" (by "Ramsdy Jay and Gang").

Track listings
 7" single
 "Les Démons de minuit" — 3:54
 "Les Démons de minuit" (instrumental) — 3:58

 12" maxi
 "Les Démons de minuit" — 6:05
 "Les Démons de minuit" (instrumental) — 4:25

Charts

Weekly charts

1 Medley version "Jusqu'au bout de la nuit", by Émile and Images
2 Soma Riba and DJ Fou version

Year-end charts

Certifications and sales

References

1986 songs
Images (band) songs
1986 debut singles
SNEP Top Singles number-one singles